Union Township is a township in Sheridan County, Kansas, United States.  As of the 2010 Census, it had a population of 42.

References

Townships in Sheridan County, Kansas
Townships in Kansas